The year 2012 was the 20th year in the history of the Ultimate Fighting Championship (UFC), a mixed martial arts promotion based in the United States. 2012 started with UFC 142: Aldo vs. Mendes and ended with UFC 155: dos Santos vs. Velasquez 2. The year saw the successful UFC Featherweight title defense by José Aldo, the crowning of Carlos Condit as the Interim Welterweight Champion, a new Lightweight Champion in Benson Henderson, a tournament to crown the first UFC Flyweight Champion as well as the finales of The Ultimate Fighter 15 and The Ultimate Fighter: Brazil.

Title fights

The Ultimate Fighter

Debut UFC fighters

The following fighters fought their first UFC fight in 2012:

Abel Trujillo
Akira Corassani
Al Iaquinta
Andrew Craig
Andy Ogle
Anistavio Medeiros
Anton Kuivanen
Antonio Carvalho
Antônio Silva
Azamat Gashimov
Ben Alloway
Bernardo Magalhaes
Besam Yousef
Brad Scott
Brendan Loughnane
Brock Jardine
Buddy Roberts
C.J. Keith
Caio Magalhaes
Carlo Prater
Cezar Ferreira
Chad Griggs
Chico Camus
Chris Clements
Chris Saunders
Chris Tickle
Cody Donovan
Colin Fletcher
Colton Smith
Cristiano Marcello
Dan Stittgen
Daniel Pineda
Daron Cruickshank
Delson Heleno
Derek Brunson
Ednaldo Oliveira
Eiji Mitsuoka
Eric Wisely
Erik Perez

Francisco Trinaldo
Glover Teixeira
Godofredo Pepey
Gunnar Nelson
Hacran Dias
Hector Lombard
Henry Martinez
Hugo Viana
Ian McCall
Issei Tamura
Jared Papazian
Jeremy Larsen
Jimi Manuwa
Joe Proctor
Joey Gambino
John Cofer
John Lineker
John Moraga
John Teixeira
John-Olav Einemo
Jon Tuck
Jussier Formiga
Justin Lawrence
Justin Salas
Khabib Nurmagomedov
Lavar Johnson
Leonardo Mafra
Magnus Cedenblad
Manuel Rodriguez
Marcelo Guimarães
Marcos Vinicius
Marcus LeVesseur
Max Holloway
Maximo Blanco
Michael Chiesa
Michael Kuiper
Mike Ricci
Mike Rio
Mike Wilkinson

Milton Vieira
Mitch Gagnon
Motonobu Tezuka
Myles Jury
Nick Denis
Nick Penner
Norman Parke
Oli Thompson
Pat Schilling
Phil Harris
Renee Forte
Reza Madadi
Robert Whittaker
Rodrigo Damm
Rony Mariano Bezerra
Rustam Khabilov
Ryan Jimmo
Sam Sicilia
Sergio Moraes
Shane del Rosario
Shawn Jordan
Simeon Thoresen
Siyar Bahadurzada
Stephen Thompson
Thiago Perpétuo
Tim Elliott
Tim Means
Tom DeBlass
Tom Watson
Tommy Hayden
Ulysses Gomez
Vinc Pichel
Wagner Campos
Wagner Prado
Yaotzin Meza
Yasuhiro Urushitani
Yoislandy Izquierdo

Events list

UFC on Fox: Evans vs. Davis

UFC on Fox: Evans vs. Davis (also known as UFC on Fox 2) was a mixed martial arts event held by the Ultimate Fighting Championship on January 28, 2012 at the United Center in Chicago, Illinois.

Background
The event was the first to be broadcast on Fox as part of a seven-year agreement between the UFC and the network and the second to air live on Fox after the inaugural UFC on Fox: Velasquez vs. Dos Santos.

A bout between Demetrious Johnson and Eddie Wineland was originally slated for this event. However, Johnson was pulled from the bout to be a participant in the UFC's Flyweight tournament set to begin in March. Wineland was then expected to face Johnny Bedford at this event. However, Wineland himself was forced out of the bout with an injury and replaced by promotional newcomer Mitch Gagnon.  Then just days before the event, the bout was cancelled due to an alleged visa issue for Gagnon.

Paul Sass was expected to face Evan Dunham, but was forced from the bout with an injury and replaced by Nik Lentz.

Cody McKenzie was expected to face Michael Johnson at the event, but was forced from the bout with an injury and replaced by Shane Roller.

Mark Muñoz was expected to face Chael Sonnen in a #1 contender's bout for a middleweight title shot, but Munoz was forced out of the bout with an injury. Michael Bisping, who was pulled from a scheduled fight with Demian Maia, replaced Munoz to face Sonnen in the #1 contender's bout. Chris Weidman would step in on 11 days notice to face Maia as Bisping's replacement.

The preliminary bout between Chris Camozzi and Dustin Jacoby was not aired on television or Facebook, making it the first bout on a UFC card to go unaired on the event's live broadcast since UFC Fight Night: Nogueira vs. Davis in March 2011.

The event averaged 4.7 million viewers with a ratings peak of 6 million viewers for the main event.

Results

Bonus awards
Fighters were awarded $65,000 bonuses.

 Fight of the Night: Evan Dunham vs. Nik Lentz
 Knockout of the Night: Lavar Johnson
 Submission of the Night: Charles Oliveira

UFC on Fuel TV: Sanchez vs. Ellenberger

UFC on Fuel TV: Sanchez vs. Ellenberger (also known as UFC on Fuel TV 1), was the first UFC event to air exclusively on Fuel TV.  It was held on February 15, 2012 at the Omaha Civic Auditorium in Omaha, Nebraska.  At the time, the event was the most watched show ever aired on Fuel TV with 217,000 viewers tuning in.

Background
The main event consisted of Diego Sanchez facing Jake Ellenberger.  Ellenberger came into the match on a five fight win streak, four of which ended by stoppage, including one against Jake Shields.  The fight against Ellenberger would become Sanchez's eighteenth fight with the UFC going back to April 2005 when he won The Ultimate Fighter 1.  Ellenberger continued his win streak defeating Sanchez by unanimous decision.

Rani Yahya was expected to face Jonathan Brookins at the event.  However, Yahya was forced out of the bout with an injury and replaced by Vagner Rocha.

Promotional newcomers Yoislandy Izquierdo and Bernardo Magalhaes were expected to face each other at the event.  However, Izquierdo was not allowed to compete due to a contractual dispute with another organization and was replaced by Tim Means.

A bout between Buddy Roberts and Sean Loeffler was scheduled for the preliminary card.  However, the pairing was scrapped on the day of the event as Loeffler injured his ankle during a pre-fight warm up.  With the loss of the Roberts/Loeffler bout, the event took place with only nine fights, making it the smallest fight card for the promotion since UFC 110 in 2010.

Results

Bonus awards
Fighters were awarded $50,000 bonuses.

 Fight of the Night: Diego Sanchez vs. Jake Ellenberger
 Knockout of the Night: Stipe Miocic
 Submission of the Night: Ivan Menjivar

UFC on Fuel TV: The Korean Zombie vs. Poirier

UFC on Fuel TV: The Korean Zombie vs. Poirier (also known as UFC on Fuel TV 3) was a mixed martial arts event held by the Ultimate Fighting Championship on May 15, 2012 at the Patriot Center in Fairfax, Virginia. Initially, this event was referred to as UFC on FX 3, but was since clarified to be a Fuel TV event.

Background
Brandon Vera was briefly scheduled to face Thiago Silva in a rematch of their January 2011 bout.  However, Vera was forced out of the bout with an injury. Igor Pokrajac stepped in to fight Silva.  Silva was subsequently pulled from the bout to replace an injured Antônio Rogério Nogueira against Alexander Gustafsson at UFC on Fuel TV: Gustafsson vs. Silva.  Pokrajac will now face Fabio Maldonado.

Yves Edwards was expected to face Donald Cerrone at the event, but Edwards was forced out of the bout with an injury and replaced by Jeremy Stephens.

Mike Easton was expected to face Yves Jabouin at the event, but Easton was forced out of the bout with an injury and replaced by Jeff Hougland who was previously expected to face Renan Barão at UFC 148.

Aaron Riley was expected to face Cody McKenzie at the event, but Riley was pulled from the event and replaced by promotional newcomer Marcus LeVesseur.

Azamat Gashimov was expected to make his promotional debut against Alex Soto. However, Gashimov was forced out of the bout with an injury and replaced by returning veteran Francisco Rivera.

The main event featured Chan Sung Jung facing Dustin Poirier.  The winner of this bout was linked to a potential bout with José Aldo for the UFC Featherweight Championship, but that fight did not materialize until 15 months later at UFC 163.

Results

Bonus awards
Fighters were awarded $40,000 bonuses.

 Fight of the Night: Dustin Poirier vs. Chan-Sung Jung
 Knockout of the Night: Tom Lawlor
 Submission of the Night: Chan-Sung Jung

Reported payout
The following is the reported payout to the fighters as reported to the Virginia Department of Professional and Occupational Regulation. It does not include sponsor money and also does not include the UFC's traditional "fight night" bonuses.

 Chan Sung Jung: $34,000 (includes $17,000 win bonus) def. Dustin Poirier: $14,000
 Amir Sadollah: $48,000 (includes $24,000 win bonus) def. Jorge Lopez: $6,000
 Donald Cerrone: $60,000 (includes $30,000 win bonus) def. Jeremy Stephens: $24,000
 Yves Jabouin: $20,000 (includes $10,000 win bonus) def. Jeff Hougland: $8,000
 Igor Pokrajac: $34,000 (includes $17,000 win bonus) def. Fabio Maldonado: $11,000
 Tom Lawlor: $24,000 (includes $12,000 win bonus) def. Jason MacDonald: $19,000
 Brad Tavares: $20,000 (includes $10,000 win bonus) def. Dongi Yang: $12,000
 Cody McKenzie: $20,000 (includes $10,000 win bonus) def. Marcus LeVesseur: $6,000
 T. J. Grant: $30,000 (includes $15,000 win bonus) def. Carlo Prater: $10,000
 Rafael dos Anjos: $36,000 (includes $18,000 win bonus) def. Kamal Shalorus: $11,000
 Johnny Eduardo: $12,000 (includes $6,000 win bonus) def. Jeff Curran: $8,000
 Francisco Rivera: $12,000 (includes $6,000 win bonus) def. Alex Soto: $6,000

UFC on FX: Johnson vs. McCall 2

UFC on FX: Johnson vs. McCall (also known as UFC on FX 3) was a mixed martial arts event held by the Ultimate Fighting Championship on June 8, 2012 at the BankAtlantic Center in Sunrise, Florida.

Background
Because of a scoring error at UFC on FX: Alves vs. Kampmann, a majority draw between Demetrious Johnson and Ian McCall was mistakenly announced as a victory for Johnson.  Dana White announced the error following the conclusion of the event and that Johnson and McCall would have a rematch. The rematch was initially reported to happen at The Ultimate Fighter 15 Finale, but instead was moved to the main card of this event, UFC on FX 3. Since then, it was announced by the UFC that the fight would be the main event of UFC on FX 3.

This was the first event that the UFC hosted in South Florida since UFC Fight Night 10 in 2007. This also was the first UFC event to be headlined by a flyweight bout.

Results

Flyweight Championship bracket

1 The initial semifinal bout between Johnson and McCall at UFC on FX 2 ended in a draw. Johnson defeated McCall in a rematch at UFC on FX 3

Bonus awards
Fighters were awarded $40,000.
 Fight of the Night: Eddie Wineland vs. Scott Jorgensen
 Knockout of the Night: Mike Pyle
 Submission of the Night: Erick Silva

Reported payout
The following is the reported payout to the fighters as reported to the Florida State Boxing Commission. It does not include sponsor money and also does not include the UFC's traditional "fight night" bonuses.

 Demetrious Johnson: $40,000 (includes $20,000 win bonus) def. Ian McCall: $9,000
 Erick Silva: $16,000 (includes $8,000 win bonus) def. Charlie Brenneman: $18,000
 Mike Pyle: $66,000 (includes $33,000 win bonus) def. Josh Neer: $14,000
 Eddie Wineland: $20,000 (includes $10,000 win bonus) def. Scott Jorgensen: $20,500
 Mike Pierce: $40,000 (includes $20,000 win bonus) def. Carlos Eduardo Rocha: $8,000
 Seth Baczynski: $20,000 (includes $10,000 win bonus) def. Lance Benoist: $8,000
 Matt Grice: $12,000 (includes $6,000 win bonus) def. Leonard Garcia: $20,000
 Dustin Pague: $20,000 (includes $10,000 win bonus) def. Jared Papazian: $6,000
 Tim Means: $16,000 (includes $8,000 win bonus) def. Justin Salas: $8,000
 Buddy Roberts: $12,000 (includes $6,000 win bonus) def. Caio Magalhaes: $8,000
 Henry Martinez: $12,000 (includes $6,000 win bonus) def. Bernardo Magalhaes: $8,000
 Sean Pierson: $20,000 (includes $10,000 win bonus) def. Jake Hecht: $8,000

UFC 149: Faber vs. Barão

UFC 149: Faber vs. Barão was a mixed martial arts event held by the Ultimate Fighting Championship on July 21, 2012 at the Scotiabank Saddledome in Calgary. It was the first event that the UFC has held in the Canadian province of Alberta.

Background

On April 24, due to a conflict with the UN Conference, the UFC Middleweight Championship bout between Anderson Silva and Chael Sonnen, which was originally scheduled to main event UFC 147 was moved to UFC 148 to serve as the new main event. Plans were then being made for José Aldo, who at the time was scheduled to defend his title at this event against an undetermined opponent, to headline UFC 147. However it was reported on April 28, 2012, that Aldo would remain on this card and defend his title against Erik Koch.

The bout between Michael Bisping and Tim Boetsch, originally scheduled for UFC 148, was moved to this event to help bolster this (the UFC 149) fight card.  However, Bisping was forced out of the bout with an injury and replaced by promotional newcomer Hector Lombard.

Yoshihiro Akiyama was expected to face Thiago Alves at this event, but was forced to pull out of the fight due to injury and replaced by Siyar Bahadurzada.  Then on June 1, Alves pulled out of the bout citing an injury and was replaced by Chris Clements. However, Bahadurzada was also forced out of the bout with an injury and replaced by Matthew Riddle.

Thiago Silva was expected to face Maurício Rua at the event. However, Silva was forced out of the bout with an injury and Rua was pulled from the event entirely, and would face Brandon Vera at UFC on Fox 4.

On June 4, 2012 it was announced that the UFC signed former DREAM champion Bibiano Fernandes. He was expected to compete against Roland Delorme. However, a week later it was announced that Fernandes was removed from the event due to injury but was later announced that Fernandes had not signed with the UFC. Francisco Rivera filled in to fight Delorme.

On June 9, 2012 it was announced that UFC featherweight champion, José Aldo was removed from the event due to injury. No replacement has yet been named for his scheduled opponent, Erik Koch. As a result, the UFC Interim Bantamweight Championship fight between Urijah Faber and Renan Barão was rescheduled as the main event of the fight.

George Roop was scheduled to fight Antonio Carvalho, but on June 26, Roop was forced out of the fight and replaced by Daniel Pineda.

Former Pride and Interim UFC Heavyweight Champion Antônio Rodrigo Nogueira was expected to face Cheick Kongo at the event.  However, Nogueira pulled out of the bout, citing that an arm injury sustained in his last bout had not healed enough to resume the proper training and was replaced by Shawn Jordan.

Claude Patrick was expected to face James Head at the event.  However, Patrick was forced out of the bout with an injury and was replaced by Brian Ebersole.

Results

Bonus awards
Fighters were awarded $65,000 bonuses.
Fight of the Night: Bryan Caraway vs. Mitch Gagnon
Knockout of the Night: Ryan Jimmo
Submission of the Night: Matthew Riddle

See also
 UFC
 List of UFC champions
 List of UFC events

References

External links
 UFC past events on UFC.com
 UFC events results on Sherdog.com

Ultimate Fighting Championship by year
2012 in mixed martial arts